Edward Howe Watson (February 28, 1874 – January 7, 1942) was a career United States Navy officer, who led a squadron of destroyers aground off Point Honda on the California coast in 1923.

Early life and marriage
Watson was born in Frankfort, Kentucky, a son of  U.S. Navy Commander John Crittenden Watson. He married Hermine Cary Gratz, whose half-sister, Helen Gratz, married Godfrey S. Rockefeller of Greenwich, Connecticut.

Navy career

Academy and early career
Watson graduated from the U.S. Naval Academy in June 1895 and served on several ships during the rest of the decade, including Spanish–American War service on board the cruiser . He commanded the storeship  in 1912–13, then attended the Naval War College. Watson also saw duty as executive officer of the battleship  and as Commanding Officer of the gunboat .

World War I

During World War I, CAPT Watson was in command of the battleship , receiving the Navy Cross "for exceptionally meritorious service in a duty of great responsibility as Commanding Officer of the U.S.S. Alabama in the Atlantic Fleet". In March 1919, he became U.S. Naval Attaché in Japan, remaining in that post until May 1922. In July of that year, he took command of Destroyer Squadron 11, based on the West Coast.

Honda Point disaster
On September 8, 1923, dead reckoning navigation errors on Watson's flagship led seven of his squadron's destroyers to ground on the rocky coast at Honda Point, California, a loss that came to be known as the Honda Point Disaster. Watson was court martialed for his role.

Not all observers agreed with the Navy's decision to punish Watson. In 1960, the authors of Tragedy at Honda argued that the causes of the tragedy lay in the failure of new technology from a navigational radio station to supply necessary data to ships operating in dense fog, but that Watson displayed outstanding honor and leadership by taking full responsibility, quoting at length the editors of the Army and Navy Journal, who wrote at the time of the court martial:

Post-Honda Point career and retirement
After the Honda Point disaster, Captain Watson served as Assistant Commandant of the Fourteenth Naval District in Hawaii until he left active duty in November 1929.

He retired to New York City, where he was in the New York Social Register. He and his family spent their summers on Walcott Avenue in Jamestown, Rhode Island, where he was a member of the Conanicut Yacht Club.

Death
Watson died in 1942 in Brooklyn, New York.

References

 Department of the Navy – Naval History and Heritage Command   This work is in the public domain.

1874 births
1942 deaths
United States Navy officers
United States Navy personnel who were court-martialed
Naval War College alumni
American military personnel of the Spanish–American War
Recipients of the Navy Cross (United States)